Saint Benedict - Our Lady of Montserrat, or simply St. Benedict's Church, is a Catholic church in Stamford, Connecticut, in the Diocese of Bridgeport.  The historic brick Neo-Tudor church at 1A St. Benedict's Circle was built in 1930 and added to the National Register of Historic Places in 1987. The architect was Henry F. Ludorf of Hartford, Connecticut.  The exterior uses a variety of building materials, including brick, ashlar stone, timbering, and stucco.  The church's main facade is asymmetrically arranged with its entrance on the left, under a handsome timber-frame porch, and a stone tower to the right which is topped by a bellpot roof.

See also
National Register of Historic Places listings in Stamford, Connecticut

References

External links 
Roman Catholic Diocese of Bridgeport

Churches on the National Register of Historic Places in Connecticut
Roman Catholic churches completed in 1930
Tudor Revival architecture in Connecticut
Roman Catholic churches in Stamford, Connecticut
National Register of Historic Places in Fairfield County, Connecticut
20th-century Roman Catholic church buildings in the United States